The men's super heavyweight (over 91 kg/200.2 lbs) Low-Kick category at the W.A.K.O. World Championships 2007 in Belgrade was the second heaviest of the male Low-Kick tournaments, involving twelve fighters from three continents (Europe, Asia and Africa).  Each of the matches was three rounds of two minutes each and were fought under Low-Kick rules.

As there were no enough contestants for a sixteen-man tournament, four of the fighters received byes through to the quarter finals.  The tournament gold medallist was Dragan Jovanović from Serbia who defeated Mikhail Shvoev from Russia in the final by unanimous decision.  Defeated semi finalists Hafiz Bahshaliyev from Azerbaijan and Ruslan Aushev from Kazakhstan won bronze medals.

Results

Key

See also
List of WAKO Amateur World Championships
List of WAKO Amateur European Championships
List of male kickboxers

References

External links
 WAKO World Association of Kickboxing Organizations Official Site

Kickboxing events at the WAKO World Championships 2007 Belgrade
2007 in kickboxing
Kickboxing in Serbia